Sir William Domville, 1st Baronet (26 December 1742 – 8 February 1833) was Lord Mayor of London for 1813–14.

He was born in St Albans, the son of Charles Domville of London and was a descendant of William Domville, elder brother of Gilbert Domvile, ancestor of the Domvile baronets of Templeogue. He set up in business as a bookseller in London before returning to live in St Albans.

He was Master of the Worshipful Company of Stationers and Newspaper Makers, a Sheriff of London for 1804–05 and Lord Mayor of London for 1813–14. In 1805 he was elected an Alderman of Queenhithe Ward and made a baronet in 1814.

He died on 8 February 1833 and was buried in St Albans Abbey. He had married Sally, the daughter of Archibald Finney and had two sons and five daughters.

References

External links
dumville.org
An obituary can be found in The Gentleman's Magazine, and Historical Chronicle, for the Year ..., Volume 103 By Edward Cave, John Nichols p 271-3

1742 births
1833 deaths
People from St Albans
English merchants
Sheriffs of the City of London
19th-century lord mayors of London
19th-century English politicians
Baronets in the Baronetage of the United Kingdom
William